The discography of American rapper 2 Chainz, consists of seven studio albums, one collaborative studio album, 10 mixtapes, 5 extended plays, 118 singles (including 79 as a featured artist), 14 promotional singles and 75 music videos.

Albums

Studio albums

Collaborative albums

Mixtapes

EPs

Singles

As lead artist

As featured artist

Promotional singles

Other charted songs

Guest appearances

Music videos

As lead artist

See also
 Playaz Circle discography

Notes

References

External links
 Official website
 
 
 

Hip hop discographies
Discographies of American artists
Discography